Anita Dunn ( Babbitt; born January 8, 1958) is an American political strategist serving as a senior advisor to U.S. President Joe Biden, having originally held the post from January 20, 2021 to August 12, 2021, and returning May 5, 2022.

Previously, she served as acting White House Communications Director in the Obama White House. Additionally, she served as managing director at SKDK, a strategic communications firm in Washington, D.C., and an advisor to the Biden presidential transition. Dunn has worked on six Democratic presidential campaigns over a period of 40 years.

Early life and education
Dunn was raised in Bethesda, Maryland, the daughter of Albert E. Babbitt and Carol Hutto Babbitt. Her father is Jewish and his brother was the modernist composer Milton Babbitt. She earned a Bachelor of Arts degree from the University of Maryland, College Park.

Career
Dunn began her career in the Carter White House, first as an intern for White House Communications Director Gerald Rafshoon and then worked for chief of staff Hamilton Jordan.

She worked on the campaign of U.S. Senator John Glenn (D-OH) in 1984, and on Capitol Hill before joining the firm founded by Bob Squier and William Knapp in 1993. She has been the adviser and communications director to Senator Bill Bradley (D-NJ), and served as the chief strategist for his presidential campaign. Dunn also served as advisor to Senator Evan Bayh (D-IN), former Senate Majority Leader Tom Daschle (D-SD) and as communications director for Al Gore's presidential campaign in 2000. In 2004, Dunn produced the media for Congressman Lloyd Doggett (D-TX). In 2006 she was hired by then-Senator Barack Obama to direct communications and strategy for his political action committee, The Hopefund. This move signaled to many that Obama was planning to run for the presidency. While advising Hopefund and Obama in 2006, she was instrumental in the preparations for the launch of Obama for America, and brought many key staffers to the Obama campaign with whom she had worked in Bayh's and Daschle's offices.

Obama campaign 
In April 2008, it was announced that Dunn, who had joined the Obama campaign in February, would be the director of communications, policy and research operations for Obama for America, where she held the title Senior Adviser and was one of the major decision makers of the Obama campaign. She was featured as one of four top advisers (along with David Axelrod, David Plouffe, and Robert Gibbs) in a 60 Minutes interview held after then-President-elect Obama's November 4, 2008, victory speech at Grant Park, Chicago, Illinois. She was described, in the 60 Minutes interview, as, "a relative newcomer who handled communications, research and policy." During the presidential transition of 2008–09, Dunn trained White House Press Secretary Robert Gibbs.

White House Communications Director 

Dunn served as interim White House Communications Director from April to November 2009.

She took the lead in the Obama administration's criticism of the Fox News Channel.

In October 2009, she appeared on CNN's Reliable Sources and was asked to discuss a statement she made to Time magazine regarding Fox News, "it's opinion journalism masquerading as news." She responded by saying, "if you were a Fox News viewer in the fall election, what you would have seen would have been that the biggest stories and biggest threats facing America were a guy named Bill Ayers and something called ACORN. The reality of it is that Fox News often operates almost as either the research arm or the communications arm of the Republican Party." She added, "And it's not ideological. Obviously, there are many commentators who have conservative, liberal, centrist, and everybody understands that. But I think what is fair to say about FOX and certainly the way we view it is that it really is more a wing of the Republican Party."

Following her statements, Glenn Beck played on his show a portion of a speech Dunn gave at a high school graduation, during which she referenced Mao-Tse-Tung and Mother Teresa as two of her "favorite political philosophers". Beck stated that the speech revealed Dunn as a Maoist, while Dunn stated that her reference was meant to be ironic, and was a quote borrowed from Lee Atwater.

Dunn left her interim post at the end of November 2009 and was replaced by her deputy Dan Pfeiffer.

After leaving the White House, Dunn rejoined SKDK. Although working for a lobbying firm, White House records show that Dunn maintained strong connections with the administration where visited over 100 times since her departure in 2009. At the same time the firm announced a "major expansion" emphasizing strategic communications and advocacy work for business. The firm added about a dozen Obama administration insiders as the firm's staff doubled in size. Among the major clients the firm took on were General Electric, AT&T, Time Warner, and Pratt & Whitney. In particular, SKDKnickerbocker corporate clients have included such controversial companies as the for-profit Kaplan University and TransCanada Corp., the developer of the Keystone XL pipeline. At the same time that Kaplan Education hired SKDK to block Obama's crackdown on predatory for-profit colleges, Dunn was known as "a close friend of President Obama."

Other SKD Knickerbocker clients include New York City landlords and real estate associations resisting stronger rent protections for tenants, big food companies such as General Mills, Pepsi Co, Nestle, Kellogg, Viacom, and McDonalds in their fight to resist Obama-era nutritional standards for marketing foods to children,  and Google and Pfizer in their campaign to cut taxes on foreign profits. Some of Dunn's own clients at SKD Knickerbocker include pro-charter lobbying groups Students First and Families for Excellent schools. Knickerbocker produced ads urging citizens and legislators to support charter schools after Mayor Bill De Blasio blocked three charter schools from opening in buildings shared by existing public schools. Dunn also represented Amazon who sought PR help from SKD Knickerbocker as it developed plans to establish a second headquarters in New York City.

As Dunn left her position as White House communications director, her husband Bob Bauer was named White House counsel. The White House granted Bauer a waiver to ethics rules intended to prohibit administration officials from working on issues affecting their former clients for two years. This exemption allowed Bauer to represent the White House, Obama's campaign, and Obama as an individual all at the same time.

Media 
During her career, Dunn has been a guest or panelist on The Daily Show, 60 Minutes, Meet the Press, Face the Nation, CBS This Morning, MTP Daily, At This Hour, Deadline: White House, This Week, and State of the Union. Dunn was also interviewed for two documentaries, The Circus: Inside the Greatest Political Show on Earth and JFK: The Making of Modern Politics.

2012 Obama campaign
During the 2012 Obama campaign, Dunn helped Obama prepare for the debates. When Journalist Lee Fang asked Dunn if she felt it was "disingenuous" to advise Barack Obama's 2012 re-election campaign "while simultaneously being paid by a lot of corporations to lobby against his reforms" Dunn said in her response, "I work with some corporations because the fact of the matter is we're in a democracy and there's a dialogue and people have a right to be heard. And the fact of the matter is that most of the time when I work with people, they have a story to be told and we tell it."

Harvey Weinstein
Ahead of reporting in The New York Times about Harvey Weinstein's alleged sexual abuse, Weinstein reached out to Dunn for public relations advice. Dunn told Weinstein "you should accept your fate graciously, and not seek to deny or discredit those who your behavior has affected." Dunn's firm stated that she was not paid for this, "was asked to speak with him by a friend" and that Weinstein was not a client of hers.

2020 Biden campaign

Dunn was hired as a senior advisor to Joe Biden's 2020 presidential campaign in 2019 to assist with communications strategy. She first met Biden in the 1980s during her time as the communications director for the Democratic Senatorial Campaign Committee, and they reconnected in 2008 when Biden was named as Obama's running mate. After Biden's disappointing fourth-place finish in the 2020 Iowa Democratic caucuses, Dunn was elevated to a more senior position managing overall campaign strategy, personnel, and finances.

On September 5, 2020, Dunn was announced to be a co-chair of the Biden-Harris Transition Team, which planned the presidential transition of Joe Biden. After Biden's victory in the general election, The Atlantic reported that Dunn was "the only person in modern presidential politics who has been in the inner circle of two winning candidates—first Barack Obama's and now Biden's."

Biden administration 
On January 15, 2021, it was announced that Dunn would serve as a senior advisor to the President of the United States in the Biden Administration. Dunn works alongside fellow senior advisors Mike Donilon and Cedric Richmond.

Dunn is involved in the strategic planning for President Biden's 2024 re-election campaign.

Personal life 
Dunn is married to Robert Bauer, former partner at Perkins Coie and former personal counsel to President Obama and the White House Counsel. In 2008, Newsweek named Dunn and Bauer the new "power couple" in Washington, D.C.

Notes

References

External links

 
 

1958 births
Living people
American people of Jewish descent
American political consultants
Biden administration personnel
Joe Biden 2020 presidential campaign
Maryland Democrats
Obama administration personnel
People from Bethesda, Maryland
Senior Advisors to the President of the United States
University of Maryland, College Park alumni
White House Communications Directors